Pagyda quinquelineata is a moth in the family Crambidae. It was described by Hering in 1903. It is found in Japan, Taiwan and China. The wingspan is 19-26 mm.

.

Moths described in 1903
Pyraustinae